Nyaya Gedditu is a 1983 Indian Kannada-language action drama film, directed by S. M. Joe Simon and produced by M. K. Balaji Singh. The film stars Shankar Nag, Tiger Prabhakar, Aarathi and Jayamala. The film has musical score by Ilaiyaraaja.

Cast

 Shankar Nag
 Tiger Prabhakar
 Aarathi In extended special appearance
 Jayamala
 Roopa Devi
 Upasane Seetharam
 Sadashiva Bramhavar
 Mico Chandru
 K. V. Manjayya
 I. B. Shankar
 Baba Singh
 P. Nanjundappa
 B. Shanthamma
 Prashanthi Nayak
 B. Sharadamma
 Rashmi
 Shankar Singh
 Negro Johnny
 Mukhyamantri Chandru

Soundtrack
The soundtrack of the film was composed by Ilaiyaraaja, with lyrics penned by R. N. Jayagopal, Geetapriya and Chi Udaya Shankar.

References

External links
 
 

1983 films
1980s Kannada-language films
Films scored by Ilaiyaraaja